Margaret Barkley is a former member of the Ohio House of Representatives from Cuyahoga County, United States.

References

Republican Party members of the Ohio House of Representatives
Women state legislators in Ohio
Living people
20th-century American politicians
20th-century American women politicians
Year of birth missing (living people)
21st-century American women